
This is a list of aircraft in alphabetical order beginning with 'S'.

Sf

SFA
(Svenska Flygmotor Aktiebolaget)
 SFA STWC3-G

SFAN
(Société Française d'Aviation Nouvelle, France)
 SFAN I 
 SFAN II
 SFAN III
 SFAN IV
 SFAN 5 Deluxe
 SFAN 11

SFCA
(Société Française de Construction Aéronautique, France)
 SFCA Lignel 10
 SFCA Lignel 16
 SFCA Lignel 161
 SFCA Lignel 20
 SFCA Lignel 20S
 SFCA Lignel 31
 SFCA Lignel 44 Cross-Country
 SFCA Lignel 46 Coach
 SFCA Maillet 20
 SFCA Maillet 201
 SFCA Maillet 21
 SFCA Maillet-Lignel 20
 SFCA Taupin
 SFCA Taupin 5/2

SFECMAS
(Société Française d'Etude et de Construction de Matériel Aéronautiques Spéciaux, France)
 SFECMAS 1301
 SFECMAS 1402 Gerfaut
 SFECMAS 1500 Guépard

SFERMA
(Société Française d'Entretien et de Réparation de Matériel Aéronautique, France)
 SFERMA Nord 1110
 SFERMA SF-60 Marquis
 SFERMA BS.60 Marquis
 SFERMA PD-146 Marquis
 S.F.E.R.M.A.-Nord 1110 Nord-Astazou

SFG
(Société Française du Gyroplane, France)
 SFG G.11E Gyroplane (manuf. at Breguet)
 SFG G.111 Gyroplane (manuf. at Breguet)
 SFG G.20 Gyroplane (manuf. at Breguet)

SFI 
(Sächsische Flugindustrie G.m.b.H.)
 SFI Ga1

SFKB 
(Samoletna Fabrika Caproni Bulgarski)
 SFKB KB-1 Peperuda ("Butterfly")
 SFKB KB-2 UT ("Instructor-Training")
 SFKB KB-2A Tchutchuliga ("Skylark")
 SFKB KB-3 Tchutchuliga-I
 SFKB KB-4 Tchutchuliga-II
 SFKB KB-5 Tchutchuliga-III
 SFKB KB-309 Papagal ("Parrot") – (KB-6)
 SFKB KB-11 Fazan (Фазан – Pheasant)

Sfreddo & Paolini
(Sociedad Anonima Sfreddo & Paolini)
 Sfreddo y Paolini I
 Sfreddo y Paolini II
 Tucan T-1

References

Further reading

External links

 List Of Aircraft (S)

de:Liste von Flugzeugtypen/N–S
fr:Liste des aéronefs (N-S)
nl:Lijst van vliegtuigtypes (N-S)
pt:Anexo:Lista de aviões (N-S)
ru:Список самолётов (N-S)
sv:Lista över flygplan/N-S
vi:Danh sách máy bay (N-S)